KRLD ( NewsRadio 1080 KRLD) is a commercial AM radio station in Dallas, Texas. Owned and operated by Audacy, Inc., the station carries an all news radio format on weekdays, switching to mostly non-political talk radio nights and weekends.  Syndicated shows include The Dave Ramsey Show, Our American Stories with Lee Habeeb and America in the Morning with John Trout.  Some weekends hours carry paid brokered programming.  Most hours begin with CBS News Radio.  The studios and offices are in Uptown Dallas.

KRLD is a Class A, clear channel station.  The daytime signal is non-directional, covering North Texas and part of Oklahoma.  KRLD shares AM 1080 with Class A WTIC Hartford, so at night, KRLD switches to a directional antenna, using a two-tower array.  The transmitter is in Garland, off Saturn Road. KRLD's AM station also broadcasts in HD Radio. KRLD is simulcast over co-owned 98.7 KLUV, 100.3 KJKK, and 105.3 KRLD-FM's secondary HD Radio subchannels.  KRLD is also available online via Audacy.

Station history
KRLD first signed on the air in October 1926.  It was originally owned by Radio Laboratories of Dallas, hence the call sign.  At first it was on the air for six hours each day, except on Wednesdays when the station closed down to make repairs and recharge the batteries. The Dallas Times Herald, then published by Edwin J. Kiest, purchased KRLD within a year of its debut, in 1927. Since 1939, KRLD has broadcast at a power of 50,000 watts, the highest allowed by the Federal Communications Commission (FCC). In the summer of 1941, KRLD moved to 1080 on the AM dial as a result of the North American Regional Broadcasting Agreement (NARBA). During the Golden Age of Radio, KRLD carried CBS network programming, including dramas, comedies, news, sports, game shows, soap operas and big band broadcasts.

KRLD expanded into FM radio in 1948 with the original KRLD-FM 92.5 (now KZPS).  The following year, it added a TV station, KRLD-TV Channel 4 (now KDFW).

For most of the 1960s and 1970s, KRLD ran blocks of different local programming, including middle of the road and country music, with some news and talk.  In April 1978, KRLD switched from a music-based format to become, at the time, the third news and information station in Dallas/Fort Worth.

KRLD originally broadcast from the Adolphus Hotel in Dallas and for a time had its main studios in Arlington, Texas, at Ameriquest Field, now known as Globe Life Park in Arlington. In the summer of 2005, the station moved operations to a 5th floor office at the southwest corner of North Fitzhugh Avenue and Central Expressway in Dallas.

KRLD achieved several firsts in the field of radio broadcasting: 
first station to present live broadcasts of high school and college football games.
first to offer continuous election returns.
first to broadcast live music and entertainment programs.  The Big D Jamboree, which originated from the since-demolished Dallas Sportatorium, was a regular Saturday fixture on KRLD in the 1950s and 1960s. KRLD also aired wrestling matches from the Sportatorium, with longtime sportscaster Bill Mercer calling the action.

History books dispute whether KRLD, KDKA in Pittsburgh, or WEAF in New York (today WFAN) was the first station to broadcast commercial announcements on radio.

Branch Davidian leader David Koresh used KRLD to broadcast his messages in 1993 during his standoff with the government and the Federal Bureau of Investigation, near Waco, Texas.

During the 1970s and 1980s, KRLD was the flagship station for the NFL's Dallas Cowboys, with Brad Sham providing color analysis and later play-by-play.  (Sham continues as the Cowboys' lead voice, though the team's games now air on sister station KRLD-FM.)  Beginning in 1995, KRLD served as the radio flagship of the MLB's Texas Rangers.  In 2009, weekday games moved from KRLD to KRLD-FM. KRLD relinquished the Rangers' English language radio rights in 2011 to sports radio station 103.3 KESN. Rangers broadcasts returned to KRLD-FM in 2015 with broadcasts moving over to KRLD (AM) when conflicting with other programming, such as Cowboy games, on the FM channel.

Over the last several decades, KRLD has gone between being an all-news station and a talk station. On September 27, 2010, KRLD began broadcasting continuous news from 5am-8pm on weekdays, as well as weekend mornings, with talk programming at night and during most of the weekend.

On February 2, 2017, CBS Radio announced it would merge with Entercom (now known as Audacy). The merger was approved on November 9, 2017, and was consummated on the 17th. Despite this, KRLD and former sister TV station KTVT (a CBS owned-and-operated affiliate) maintained a strong partnership up until April 26, 2018, when Entercom struck a new content deal with NBC owned-and-operated KXAS-TV.

Honors
The Radio Television Digital News Association announced on June 12, 2013, that the KRLD Afternoon News had been chosen as the recipient of the prestigious 2013 National Edward R. Murrow Award for Best Newscast in the Large Market Radio category.

Texas State Network
KRLD has long served as the flagship station for the Texas State Network, which provides KRLD and other stations around the state with news, sports and weather info.  Some reporters are based at the KRLD studios, with others at the state capital in Austin and other parts of Texas.

References

DFW Radio Archives
DFW Radio/TV History

External links
 
 

Metromedia
All-news radio stations in the United States
Texas Rangers (baseball)
Radio stations established in 1926
Garland, Texas
RLD
American Basketball Association flagship radio stations
1926 establishments in Texas
Audacy, Inc. radio stations
Clear-channel radio stations